Anil Kushwaha born 7 October 1960) is an MLA in Chhattisgarh from The Indian National Congress.

Political career
He has been the president of District Congress Committee and a member of the District Panchayat.

In the year 2013, he became an MLA in the Chhattisgarh Legislative Assembly for the first time from Ramanujganj (Vidhan Sabha constituency).

References

See also
Chhattisgarh Legislative Assembly
2013 Chhattisgarh Legislative Assembly election

Indian National Congress politicians from Chhattisgarh
1960 births
Living people